Rae Bareli is one of the 80 Lok Sabha (parliamentary) constituencies in the northern Indian state of Uttar Pradesh. It is considered a bastion of the Indian National Congress.

Vidhan Sabha segments
Presently, Rae Bareli comprises five Vidhan Sabha (legislative assembly) segments. These are:

Members of Lok Sabha

Election results

General Election 1957
 Winner 1/2 Feroze Gandhi (INC) : 162,595 votes   
 - - - defeated Nand Kishore (IND) : 133,342
 AND 
 Baij Nath Kureel (INC) : 126,318 votes 
 - - - defeated Chhote Lal (Jana Sangh) : 100,651

By-poll 1960
 R.P. Singh (INC) : 104,840 votes
 N.B. Singh (JS) : 62,809

General Election 1971

 

 Gandhi's election was annulled by the Allahabad High Court in June 1975 on a technicality, but the Supreme Court of India overturned the decision following an amendment to the constitution.

General Election 1977

 
 

This time the incumbent Prime minister Indira Gandhi lost to her opponent, the only such instance to date until 2019.

General Election 1980
 Indira Gandhi (Congress) : 2,23,903
 Vijayaraje Scindia (Janata Party) : 50,249
Gandhi was also elected from Medak. She retained her seat in Medak and resigned from Rae Bareli.

By-poll in 1980
 A.K.Nehru (Indira Congress) 176,456
 Janeshwar Mishra  (Charan Singh's JNP(S)) :  69,166
 Details of some elections (1984 to 1991) missing from this page

General Election 1996

General Election 1998

General Election 1999

General Election 2004

By-election 2006

General Election 2009

General Election 2014

General Election 2019

See also
 Raebareli district
 List of Constituencies of the Lok Sabha

Notes

Lok Sabha constituencies in Uttar Pradesh
Raebareli district